Kusto may refer to:

 Kustö, the Swedish name of Kuusisto (island), Finland
 Marek Kusto (born 1954), Polish football player
 Microsoft Kusto, a query language used in Azure Data Explorer